The 1968–69 season was Fussball Club Basel 1893's 75th season in their existence. It was their 23rd consecutive season in the top flight of Swiss football after their promotion the season 1945–46. Harry Thommen was the club's chairman of the board for the third consecutive season. Basel played their home games in the St. Jakob Stadium.

Overview

Pre-season
During this season Helmut Benthaus was the club's player-manager for the fourth consecutive season. Paul Fischli joined the team coming from Young Fellows Zürich. Jürgen Sundermann signed in from Servette and Walter Balmer joined from Thun. In the other direction Hanspeter Stocker left the club after eight years and moved to Baden for his last season before retiring from his active football career. Between the years 1960 and 1968 Stocker played a total of 309 games for Basel scoring a total of 34 goals. 171 of these games were in the Nationalliga A, 28 in the Swiss Cup, 28 were on European level and 82 were friendly games. He scored 22 goal in the domestic league, 3 in the Cup, 2 in the European matches and the other seven were scored during the test games. Markus Pfirter left the club after seven years and went on to St. Gallen. Between the years 1961 and 1968 Pfirter played a total of 263 games for Basel scoring a total of 54 goals. 143 of these games were in the Nationalliga A, 27 in the Swiss Cup, 28 in European competitions and 65 were friendly games. He scored 29 goal in the domestic league, 10 in the Cup and one in the International Football Cup. The other 14 were scored during the test games. Also, Roberto Frigerio left the club after a total of seven years. He moved to Bellinzona. Between the years 1958 to 1960 and again from 1963 to 1968, Frigerio played a total of 256 games for Basel scoring a total of 176 goals. 144 of these games were in the Nationalliga A, 23 in the Swiss Cup, 18 in the european competitions (Cup of the Alps, Inter-Cities Fairs Cup, European Cup) and 71 were friendly games. He scored 74 goals in the domestic league, 22 in the Swiss Cup, 7 in the european competitions and the other 73 were scored during the test games. Moscatelli left after five years and went to Lugano. Between the years 1964 and 1967 Moscatelli played a total of 95 games for Basel scoring a total of 27 goals. 47 of these games were in the Nationalliga A, 12 in the Swiss Cup, 11 were on European level (Cup of the Alps, Inter-Cities Fairs Cup) and 25 were friendly games. He scored 8 goals in the domestic league, three in the Swiss Cup, one in the Cup of the Alps and the other 15 were scored during the test games.

Basel played a total of 52 matches in this season. 26 of these games were in the domestic league, three were in the Swiss Cup, five were in the Cup of the Alps, two were in the Inter-Cities Fairs Cup and 15 were friendly matches. Of these 15 test games 12 were won and two ended with a draw and one ended in a defeat. Seven were played at home and eight played away.

Domestic league
There were 14 teams contesting in the 1968–69 Nationalliga A. These were the top 12 teams from the previous 1967–68 season and the two newly promoted teams Winterthur and St. Gallen. Basel finished the league season as champions one point ahead of Lausanne Sports in second position, who they defeated 4–0 in the second last match of the season, and six points clear of FC Zürich who finished third. Basel won 13 of the 26 games, drawing ten, losing three times, they scored 48 goals conceding 28. Helmut Hauser was the team's top goal scorer with 16 league goals. Karl Odermatt, Jürgen Sundermann and Walter Balmer each scored 5 league goals. Both Sundermann and Ramseier played in all 26 league matches that season.

Swiss Cup
In the Swiss Cup Basel started in the round of 32 with a 2–1 away win against Thun and in the round of 16, with a home match, they beat Luzern 3–1. In the Quarter-final Basel played an away game against Servette but lost this 1–0.

Inter-Cities Fairs Cup and Cup of the Alps
In the Inter-Cities Fairs Cup Basel were drawn against Bologna the first leg away from home on 18 September the return leg in Basel on 2 October. Bologna won both games. In the 1968 Cup of the Alps the team managed to win the group and played in the final against FC Schalke 04 but were defeated 1–3 after extra time.

Players 

 
 

 
 
 
 
 
 
 

 
 

 

 
 

 
 

Players who left the squad

Results 
Legend

Friendly matches

Pre- and mid-season

Winter break

Nationalliga

League matches

League standings

Swiss Cup

Inter-Cities Fairs Cup

First round

Bologna won 6–2 on aggregate.

Cup of the Alps

Group A matches

Group A table

Final

See also
 History of FC Basel
 List of FC Basel players
 List of FC Basel seasons

References

Sources 
 Rotblau: Jahrbuch Saison 2015/2016. Publisher: FC Basel Marketing AG. 
 Die ersten 125 Jahre. Publisher: Josef Zindel im Friedrich Reinhardt Verlag, Basel. 
 Switzerland 1968–69 at RSSSF
 Cup of the Alps 1968 at RSSSF

External links
 FC Basel official site

FC Basel seasons
Basel
1968-69